The list of shipwrecks in October 1826 includes some ships sunk, wrecked or otherwise lost during October 1826.

1 October

2 October

4 October

7 October

8 October

9 October

11 October

14 October

16 October

17 October

19 October

20 October

21 October

22 October

24 October

25 October

26 October

27 October

28 October

29 October

30 October

31 October

Unknown date

References

1826-10